Naya Nasha is a 1973 Bollywood action film directed by Hari Dutt. The film stars Nanda and Ranjit Mallick in lead roles.

Cast
Nanda as Reena Chaudhary 
Ranjit Mallick as Dr. Samar Chaudhary
Asit Sen as Reena's Grandfather
Manmohan Krishna as Reena's Father 
Achala Sachdev as Reena's Mother 
Ramesh Deo as Protesting Student's Father 
Seema Deo as Protesting Student's Mother  
Nana Palsikar as Protesting Student's Father
Madan Puri as Politician 
Prithviraj Kapoor as Rana 
Amrit Patel as Kundan
Sharad Kumar as Sharad 
Murad as Judge

Soundtrack
The music was composed by Sapan Chakraborty and released by Saregama. All lyrics were penned by Anand Bakshi.

External links
 
1973 films
1970s Hindi-language films
1973 action films
Indian action films